Arts District Station, located at the corner of Broad and Adams, is a Richmond, Virginia bus station site of the GRTC Bus Rapid Transit route.

Station layout

References

External links
 Arts District station

Buildings and structures in Richmond, Virginia
GRTC Pulse stations
2018 establishments in Virginia
Bus stations in Virginia
Transport infrastructure completed in 2018